Philip Levy (born 27 April 1943) is a South African former cricketer. He played in two first-class matches for Border in 1969/70 and 1970/71.

See also
 List of Border representative cricketers

References

External links
 

1943 births
Living people
South African cricketers
Border cricketers
Sportspeople from Qonce